Monona could refer to any of the following.

Geographical locations:
 Monona County, Iowa, a county in Iowa, United States
 Monona, Iowa, city in Clayton County, Iowa, United States
 Monona Township, Clayton County, Iowa, township in Clayton County, Iowa, United States 
 Monona, Wisconsin, a suburb of Madison in Dane County
 Monona Grove High School, a high school in Monona, Wisconsin
 Lake Monona, a lake in Dane County, Wisconsin
Points of interest
 Monona Terrace, a convention center in Madison, Wisconsin